Hypocementosis is a reduction in the amount of cementum on a tooth root. It is a feature of conditions such as cleidocranial dysplasia and hypophosphatasia.

References

Congenital disorders of musculoskeletal system
Transcription factor deficiencies
Rare diseases